The Jutuva or Jotuba River is a river of Paraná state in southern Brazil. It is a tributary of the Pitangui River in the Represa dos Alagados.

See also
List of rivers of Paraná

References

Rivers of Paraná (state)